Satchmo in Style is a 1959 studio album by Louis Armstrong, arranged by Gordon Jenkins.

Reception

The Allmusic review by Ken Dryden awarded the album two stars and said that "...the jazz content is minimal and the music is plagued by the rather dated charts and a rather nauseating choir on over half of the tracks. Likewise, the strings (when present) are overbearing and haven't stood the test of time as well as Armstrong's warm vocals and still potent trumpet, though he isn't featured as a trumpeter all that much." Dryden praised Armstrong's duet with Velma Middleton on "You're Just In Love", and "I Want a Butter and Eggman".

Track listing
 "Blueberry Hill" (Vincent Rose, Al Lewis, Larry Stock) – 2:54
 "It's All In the Game" (Carl Sigman, Charles Dawes) – 3:24
 "Jeannine (I Dream of Lilac Time)" (Nathaniel Shilkret, L. Wolfe Gilbert) – 3:24
 "Chloe" (Gus Kahn, Neil Moret) – 3:06
 "Indian Love Call" (Rudolf Friml, Herbert Stothart, Oscar Hammerstein II, Otto Harbach) – 3:12
 "Listen to the Mocking Bird" (Septimus Winner, Richard Milburn) – 3:06
 "That Lucky Old Sun (Just Rolls Around Heaven All Day)" (Beasley Smith, Haven Gillespie) – 3:06
 "The Whiffenpoof Song (Baa! Baa! Baa!)" (Tod Galloway, Meade Minnigerode, George S Pomeroy) – 2:59
 "Trees" (Oscar Rasbach, Joyce Kilmer) – 3:06
 "Bye and Bye" (Traditional) – 3:20
 "Spooks!" (Matt Dubey, Harold Karr) – 2:37
 "When It's Sleepy Time Down South" (Clarence Muse, Leon Renè, Otis Renè) – 3:14
 "You're Just in Love" (Irving Berlin) – 2:43 (with Velma Middleton)
 "If" (Stanley Damerell, Tolchard Evans) – 3:23
 "I Want a Big Butter and Eggman" (Louis Armstrong, Percy Venable) – 3:17
 "When It's Sleepy Time Down South" (alternative lyrics) – 3:14

Personnel
Louis Armstrong – trumpet, vocals
Hollis King – art direction
Sherniece Smith – art producer
Jack Lesberg – double bass
Arvell Shaw
Phil Stephens
Bob McCracken – clarinet:
Isabelle Wong – design
Johnny Blowers – drums
Cozy Cole
Nick Fatool
Romeo Penque – flute, woodwind
Carl Kress – guitar
Allan Reuss
Art Ryerson
Philip Bailey – liner notes
Kevin Reeves – mastering
Peter Keepnews – notes editing
Burt Korall – original liner notes
Milt Gabler – producer
Cynthia Sesso – photo research
Charlie LaVere – piano
Bernie Leighton
Marty Napoleon
Bryan Koniarz – production supervisor
Ben Young – reissue producer
Carlos Kase – research
Wayne E. Songer – alto saxophone
Milt Yaner
Art Drelinger – tenor saxophone
Dent Eckels
Eddie Miller
Thomas Parshley
Red Ballard – trombone
Will Bradley
Billy Butterfield – trumpet
Charles Gifford
Chris Griffin
Bruce Hudson
Yank Lawson
Carl Poole
George Thow
Velma Middleton – vocals
George Berg – woodwind
Gordon Jenkins – arranger, conductor

References

Decca Records albums
Louis Armstrong albums
Albums produced by Milt Gabler
Albums arranged by Gordon Jenkins
1959 albums